José Campos Torres (December 20, 1953 – May 5, 1977) was a 23-year-old Mexican-American and veteran who was beaten by several Houston Police Department (HPD) officers, which subsequently led to his death. He had been brutally assaulted by a group of on-duty police officers on May 5, 1977, after being arrested for disorderly conduct at a bar in Houston's Mexican-American East End neighborhood.

After Torres' arrest at the bar, the officers took him to the city jail for booking. But his injuries were so extensive that a supervisor instead ordered the officers to take Torres to a local hospital for immediate medical treatment. The officers did not comply with the order, and three days later, his severely beaten dead body was found floating in the Buffalo Bayou, a creek on the outskirts of downtown Houston.

Following the discovery of Torres' body, two of the arresting officers, Terry W. Denson and Stephen Orlando, were charged with murder. Three other officers were fired from the HPD by Police Chief B.G. Bond, but no criminal charges were brought against them. A rookie officer who was present at the scenes of Torres' torture and drowning was a key witness for the prosecution. Denson and Orlando were convicted at the state level for Torres' death, and found guilty of negligent homicide (a misdemeanor). An all-white jury sentenced the officers to one year's probation and a one dollar fine.
 
The racial composition of the jury, and the minimized criminal convictions and sentencing sparked community outrage, leading to multiple protests and the 1978 Moody Park Riot.  His death led to negotiations between advocacy-based non-profits and HPD officials, which resulted in the addition of policies that addressed police-community racial relations.

Following the State of Texas' controversial convictions of the two former officers, the Torres case was reviewed at the federal level by the U.S. Department of Justice, which led to three of the officers' federal convictions for violating Torres' civil rights.

Torres' murder generated significant newspaper coverage across the United States. Initially, it focused on his assault and drowning, but soon it turned its attention to the historic racism, lack of HPD over-watch and the recurring absence of state and federal investigations. Later, a locally produced documentary appeared, entitled The Case of Joe Campos Torres, which focused on the history of police misconduct in Houston. In the year following his death, a poetic song by vocalist and activist Gil Scott-Heron appeared, titled "Poem for José Campos Torres", reflecting the struggles surrounding racism and police brutality.

On Saturday April 2, 2022 The City of Houston unveiled the Joe Campos Torres Memorial Plaza and trail along Buffalo Bayou. It is meant to remember the life of Torres and the impact his murder had on his family and the community. Mayor of Houston Sylvester Turner said of the memorial "Mr. Campos Torres was brutally murdered in 1977. Nothing we do will bring him back to his loved ones. The monument will send a message; his life mattered, and our city will never let something like this happen again." Shawn Carreon, Torres' nephew, was quoted as well saying "Today is just to celebrate my uncle, Joe Campos Torres. My moms [sic] brother. I know she's been hurting and my grandmother has been hurting for the longest time, but now they can finally have some peace,"

Background
José Campos Torres was born to José Luna Torres Jr. in a poor family of Mexican descent. The family resided in a  barrio in Houston, Texas. Torres achieved only an eighth-grade education. It is believed that a side effect of the poverty he experienced is what led to his constant struggle with his social demeanor.

According to family and friends, Torres' dream was to run and own a karate school. He wanted to open the school near his East End neighborhood, allowing him to teach young people the art of self-defense. To pursue his dream, he realized that he needed a General Education Diploma (GED), a driver's license, and a job, preferably as a lineman with a telephone company.

Richard Vargas, Torres' longtime friend, said that when Torres was 23 years old, he still felt emotionally lost, and was fighting a sporadic problem with alcohol. Torres would occasionally become very intoxicated, and his friends and family said that it was this that would trigger his aggression, in wanting to fight. Torres' younger brothers, Gilbert, 20 and Ray, 16 acknowledged that Torres had an occasional problem with alcohol abuse. "Alcohol really got to him sometimes." Vargas said, "Sometimes when he drank a lot he wanted to fight ... I didn't like to be around Joe when he was drinking. When he got drunk, he'd start practicing his karate. He'd yell and kick and punch at the air." When Torres was a teenager he got into a lot of fights, and yet he had confided to Vargas that he knew that the fighting would get him nowhere.

Torres' father said that his son spent two years in the United States Army. During his military service, he was accepted to the United States Army Rangers, undergoing training at Fort Bragg in North Carolina. While in training, he was separated from the service in September 1976, under a 'general discharge.' It was reported that his abuse of alcohol and anger outbursts are what ultimately led to his early release from the U.S. Army. His brother Gilbert said, "Before the service, Joe was bum and a drifter, but after he got out he really cut down on the drinking ... The normal Joe was different from the drunk Joe." He said, "The drunk Joe got rowdy easy and he [took] things the wrong way sometimes."

Just two weeks before his death, Torres found employment as a glass contractor, earning $2.75 an hour. Vargas said that Torres had difficulty staying employed ever since his discharge from the U.S. Army. He said that Torres resented his being  restricted to tedious, low paying jobs due to his low education level and nominal military skills. Even though Torres had received training in the military as a telecommunications lineman, not having his GED and a driver's license were barriers to employment with a potential telecommunications provider.

Vargas said, Torres' true passions were physical fitness and the art of karate. After his return from the U.S. Army he was working to receive a black belt (expert) rating in karate. In addition to his progress in karate, he also underwent weight training and jogged, frequently attaching weights to his feet.

Incident
Shortly before midnight on May 5, 1977, Torres was at the Club 21, a bar in Houston's predominantly Hispanic East End neighborhood, wearing his army fatigues and military boots. He had apparently been drinking, and police officers arrived,  arresting him for disorderly conduct. The six officers who responded took Torres to "The Hole", a spot behind a warehouse overlooking Houston's Buffalo Bayou, and beat him there. The officers then took Torres to the city jail, who refused to process him due to his injuries. A supervisor ordered to take him to Ben Taub Hospital, but instead of doing so, the officers took him back to "The Hole",  and pushed him off a wharf into the water. Torres's body was found three days later.

Trials
Officers Terry W. Denson and Stephen Orlando were tried on state murder charges. They were convicted of negligent homicide and received one year of probation and a one dollar fine. In 1978, Denson, Orlando and fired officer Joseph Janish were subsequently convicted of federal civil rights violations, and served nine months in prison.

Moody Park Riot

On the one year anniversary of José Campos Torres' murder a riot was started at Moody Park located in Houston's Near Northside neighborhood.  The riot broke out on the evening of Sunday, May 7, 1978, at approximately 7:30 pm, once a Cinco de Mayo fiesta event ended at the park.  Between five and six thousand people attended the celebration.

Police arrived at the park in response to a call for an incident of disorderly conduct.  It remains unclear on how the riot started.  Some reports reflect that the officers were making a few arrests and this is when people in the event began yelling, "No you are not taking them" and "You'll kill them the way you killed José Campos Torres".  The crowd's initial yelling immediately lead people to begin chanting in unison "Justice for Joe Torres" "Viva Joe Torres" and "A Chicano's life is worth more than a dollar!" The crowd then began throwing bottles and rocks at the officers.

The Fulton Village shopping center's stores at 2900 Fulton street, were looted and set on fire. Abe Weiner, an owner of a department store in the shopping center, said it took the fire department over an hour to respond to his emergency 9-1-1 call for help. Three large buildings and two smaller ones in the shopping center were looted and stripped by fires. The rioting escalated to over a  area adjacent to Moody Park. A total of six stores and one gasoline station were set on fire.

Officers were promptly deployed in riot gear to try and control the gathering of approximately 1,500 people according to police (other estimates reflect 150–300) who took part in the riot.  Some rioters had flipped cars over and set them on fire, fourteen of the eighteen smashed and burned cars were police cars. The property damage of businesses and police vehicles reached $500,000. At least 28 people were taken into custody after the violence started in the predominantly Mexican-American neighborhood.  The incident and all the fires were finally under control at 3:00 am.

Houston police officer Tommy A. Britt suffered a broken leg when hit by a car while trying to close off one of the streets involved in the riot. The driver Rogelio Castillo did not pull over, but was apprehended a few blocks away from the incident. The first news reporters to arrive at the scene were KPRC-TV reporter Jack Cato, and reporter/photographer Phil Archer. Both were beaten and stabbed. Cato suffered a punctured lung from a stab wound in the lower back. Archer was hit in the face with a brick and then stabbed in the left hip while lying unconscious on the pavement. Rioters attempted to smash the camera he was carrying. It was later recovered, badly damaged. Cato managed to bring out the video shot during the attack which shows some of the rioters surrounding a burning Houston Fire Department ambulance supervisor's car. The riot's violence left a total of five police officers, two news personnel and eight rioters injured and hospitalized. None of the fifteen hospitalized people died due to their injuries.

Apology
In June 2021, police chief Troy Finner apologized to the Torres family, calling the killing "straight-up murder."

Popular culture

Books
Author Dwight Watson dedicated the chapter "The Storm Clouds of Change: The Death of José Campos Torres and the Emergence of Triracial Politics in Houston" in the book Race and the Houston Police Department, 1930–1990 A Change Did Come.  The chapter covers the impact of Torres' murder on society and changes in Houston's policing policies.

Music

Poem for José Campos Torres

Vocalist and activist Gil Scott-Heron, known as the "Godfather of Rap" and for his sociology charged spoken word performances in the '70s.  Scott-Heron's best-known recording is the 1971 released "The Revolution Will Not be Televised", this artwork characterizes unashamed consumerism.

Scott-Heron's artistry based on self-fortitude and resentment of racism spanned across racial cultures and was popular among both African-Americans and Latinos. In 1978, the year following Torres' murder, he targeted community awareness of the murder and created a poetic song focusing on America's systemic abuse of Asian-Americans, African-Americans and Hispanics in the heartfelt "Poem for José Campos Torres." The song was released as track 4 of the album titled; The Mind of Gil Scott-Heron.

Scott-Heron saw Torres as a brother and made his familial tie to Torres in the lyrics, here is a quote from the song:

El Ballad De José Campos Torres

Charanga Cakewalk is the stage name for Michael Ramos, a self-described Latino Chicano Mexican who is also a citizen of the world. Ramos, from Austin, TX, is an instrumental artist who passes a distinguishing sound of Latino music onto the next generation of artistry. Ramos has played numerous instruments in studios and on-tours for John Mellencamp, Patty Griffin, Los Lonely Boys, Paul Simon and multiple notable artist. His artwork is self-styled as Cumbia-Tronic that soars between absorbed Electronic Dance and cultivated genres of Cumbia, Ranchera, Folklorica, and Garage Rock.

In March 2006, Charanga Cakewalk released the album Chicano Zen. The album has multiple instrumental songs, track 11 the closing song is the instrumental titled: "El Ballad de José Campos Torres", with a synth, accordion and piano drift inspired by the life of Torres:

Moody Park Riot (José Campos Torres)

In 2014 Nuño Records published, via SoundCloud, the song "Moody Park Riot (José Campos Torres)" written by Juan Nuño performed by Jesse James at Houston, TX.  The lyrics depict Torres' beating and drowning along with events tied to the 1978 Moody Park Riot.

Television

Interview with Janie Torres

Art Browning hosted a television interview with Torres' little sister Janie Torres. The episode, produced by Green Watch Television (GWTV), is titled: "Joe Campos Torres, 40 years ago", first aired: Wednesday, April 26, 2017, duration: 24 min. When Browning asked about her thoughts on the establishment of Black Lives Matter she replied:

At the closing of the interview, Janie Torres, who was only a  when her brother's life was taken, announced plans for an annual solidarity walk in memory of her brother. The walk is targeted across all generations with the focus on awareness of police racism across the nation.  The second annual walk and rally occurred on May 6, 2017, in Houston, Texas.  Janie plans on continuing to hold the walks annually, to be held on the yearly anniversaries of her brother's murder. For social awareness she has posted the walk on a Facebook homepage; "Joe Campos Torres Solidarity Walk For Past & Future Generations".

Films

The Case of Joe Campos Torres
The documentary The Case of Joe Campos Torres recounts the calendar of events and ensuing community-protest assemblies, community/police department discussions, along with the legal actions taken by the Torres family against the Houston Police Department and the City of Houston.

Filmed around Houston, the documentary records the Latino communities reaction to what they witnessed as an act of racial injustice against their population. The documentary, approximately 30 – 40 minutes in length, replays raw footage taken from local news station's archives.  The footage is used as a reminder to viewers that before video cameras were able to bring police misconduct to light, the family of Torres had to rely on community support to help them find justice.

The film was produced in 1977 by Tony Bruni and Houston's KPRC-TV, Channel 2.  Carlos Calbillo both wrote and edited the film and it was reported by John Quiñones, who is now with ABC News and hosts the series What Would You Do?.

Podcast

Chicano Squad
Podcast discussing the murder of Mr. Torres and the resulting formation of a homicide squad made up of chicano officers. https://podcasts.voxmedia.com/show/chicano-squad

See also

References

External links
Joe Campos Torres Solidarity Walk For Past & Future Generations Facebook page
Press Conference about Moody Park Riot (1978), Texas Archive of the Moving Image

Police misconduct in the United States
Race riots in the United States
1954 births
May 1977 crimes
1977 deaths
1977 in Texas
1977 murders in the United States
American manslaughter victims
American murder victims
American people of Mexican descent
Civil rights protests in the United States
Crimes in Houston
Deaths by person in Texas
Deaths in police custody in the United States
History of Houston
History of racism in Texas
Houston Police Department
Houston Police Department officers
Law enforcement in Texas
Manslaughter victims
May 1977 events in the United States
Mass media-related controversies in the United States
Mexican-American culture in Houston
Mexican-American history
Murder in Texas
Murdered Mexican Americans
People from Houston
People murdered by law enforcement officers in the United States
People murdered in Texas
Police misconduct
Protests in the United States
Race and crime in the United States
Racially motivated violence against Hispanic and Latino Americans
Racially motivated violence in the United States
Riots and civil disorder in Texas
United States Army soldiers
1970s in Houston